The 2004 Winchester Council election took place on 10 June 2004 to elect members of Winchester District Council in Hampshire, England. One third of the council was up for election and the Liberal Democrats lost overall control of the council to no overall control.

Campaign
19 seats were contested in the election with the Liberal Democrats defending 14, the Conservatives and Independents 2 each and Labour 1 seat. The Liberal Democrats were expected to be deprived of their majority on the council as they only needed to lose 1 seat for this to happen. The Conservatives were the main challengers, with Labour only in contention in the wards of St John and All Saints and St Luke. With the election being held at the same time as the European elections, the presence of 6 candidates from the United Kingdom Independence Party for the first time was seen as possibly affecting the results.

Issues in the election included planning, the status of local neighbourhoods and the council tax.

Election result
The Liberal Democrats lost their majority on the council for the first time since 1995, with the Conservatives gaining 4 seats from them. However the Liberal Democrats did gain one seat from Labour in St John and All Saints ward. Voter turnout in the election was significantly up at 48.8%, compared to 39.76% in the 2003 election.

Following the election the Liberal Democrats continued to run the council as a minority administration.

Ward results

Bishop's Waltham

Boarhunt & Southwick

Colden Common and Twyford

Compton and Otterbourne

Denmead

Kings Worthy

Littleton and Harestock

Olivers Battery & Badger Farm

Shedfield

St. Barnabas

St. Bartholomew

St. John and All Saints

St. Luke

St. Michael

St. Paul

The Alresfords

Whiteley

Wickham

Wonston and Micheldever

References

2004
2004 English local elections
2000s in Hampshire